Gin Rummy is a video game adaptation of the classic card game on Xbox Live Arcade for the Xbox 360 published by Vivendi Games under their Sierra Online division and developed by Sierra Online Shanghai, which was formerly known as Studio Ch'in. It was released on September 3, 2008.

Features

The game will include six variations of gin rummy, including Classic Gin Rummy, Speed Gin Rummy, Oklahoma Gin, Hollywood Gin, and Three-Hand Gin. Players will also be permitted to create their own house rules.

The game also supports the Xbox Live Vision camera.

References 

2008 video games
Digital card games
Video games developed in China
Xbox 360 Live Arcade games
Xbox 360-only games
Xbox 360 games